Walter Hungerbühler (9 August 1930 – 27 March 2012) was a Swiss football referee.

Refereeing career
In 1969, Hungerbühler became a referee in the Swiss Super League, the top flight of football in Switzerland. In 1972, he was appointed as a FIFA referee.

In 1976, Hungerbühler was appointed as a referee for UEFA Euro 1976, where he officiated the third place play-off between the Netherlands and Yugoslavia.

Hungerbühler retired from refereeing in 1978.

References

External links
 Profile at worldfootball.net

1930 births
2012 deaths
Sportspeople from St. Gallen (city)
Swiss football referees
UEFA Euro 1976 referees